Cosmos College of Management and Technology is an engineering and management college, affiliated to Pokhara University, located in Lalitpur, Nepal established in 2001 by its chairman, Uttam N. Shrestha, who is the former Dean of IOE Pulchowk. It is affiliated with the Pokhara University.

Courses offered
The college offers courses in
Engineering :
 Bachelor of Civil Engineering - 144 seats
 Bachelor of Computer Engineering - 48 seats
 Bachelor of Engineering in Information Technology- 48 seats
 Bachelor of Electronics and Communication Engineering - 48 seats
 Bachelor of Architecture - 48 seats
Management :
 Bachelor of Business Administration (BBA) - 48 seats

External links
 http://www.cosmoscollege.edu.np/

Universities and colleges in Nepal
2001 establishments in Nepal